Harold Willard Bradley Jr. (October 13, 1929 – April 13, 2021) was an American professional football player and an Italian actor, singer, and visual artist.  He played college football for the Iowa Hawkeyes and played four seasons in the National Football League (NFL) from 1954–1958.  He later starred in over 25 Italian films as an actor and opened an art and music studio in Rome.

Childhood

Harold Bradley Jr. was born in Chicago, and grew up in the West Woodlawn neighborhood on Chicago's south side.  His father, Harold Bradley Sr., was one of 13 African-Americans to participate in the NFL before World War II, playing for the Chicago Cardinals in 1928.  Like his father before him, Harold Bradley Jr. played football at Englewood High School in Chicago and enrolled at the University of Iowa after graduation.

University of Iowa

By joining the Hawkeyes football team, Harold Bradley Jr. completed the first African-American father-son combination to play football for the University of Iowa; his father played for the Hawkeyes in 1926.  Bradley Jr. was one of five African-Americans to play for the Hawkeye football team in 1950, when the team finished the season with a road game at the University of Miami.  Bradley and his four African-American teammates, nicknamed the "Orange Bowl Five", became the first African-Americans to play at the historic Orange Bowl stadium, a contest won by Miami, 14-6.

Bradley capped his Hawkeye football career by being named team MVP of the 1950 Iowa football team. He graduated from Iowa in 1951 with a degree in fine arts.

Professional football

After leaving Iowa, Bradley served for three years in the U.S. Marines.  He played football for a team called the Marine Corps Recruit Depot San Diego Devil Dogs from 1951–1953, where he was discovered by a coach for the Cleveland Browns. Bradley then played three seasons for the Cleveland Browns from 1954–1956, winning NFL championships with the team in 1954 and 1955.  He finished his pro football career with the Philadelphia Eagles in 1958.

By playing four seasons of pro football in the 1950s, Bradley joined with his father to complete the first African-American father-son combination to ever play in the NFL.

Artistic career, television host and movie roles

Bradley earned a scholarship in 1959 to study at the University for Foreigners of Perugia in Italy.  He then opened an art studio in Rome named Folkstudio in 1962.  During the day, Bradley used the studio to display his paintings while turning it into a jazz club in the evenings. Several prominent musicians, including Bob Dylan and Pete Seeger, would go on to perform at Folkstudio.

Bradley also broke into acting in 1960, landing a role the following year in the film Barabbas.  He would star in more than a dozen Italian films over the next seven years, mostly in the sword-and-sandal genre.  Bradley's cinematic work during this time included notable roles in two 1965 films: Tucos in Sette contro tutti (Seven Rebel Gladiators) and George Harris in La capanna dello zio Tom (Uncle Tom's Cabin).

In 1968, Harold Bradley Jr. moved back to the United States after accepting a job as a curator for the Illinois Arts Council, in Chicago. He went on to teach history of education at the University of Illinois at Urbana–Champaign and work with the university's Center for Upgrading Education Services (CUES) in its extension projects with local Champaign schools. Later, he took on a posting at the Illinois State Board of Education, in Springfield, producing instructional and educational television.

During the 18 years he spent commuting between Champaign, Illinois and Springfield, Illinois he produced and hosted three prime-time public-affairs shows – Soul Side , Close-Up   for the CBS affiliate and "People Beat" for the NBC affiliate. Race and intercultural issues were the main focus of his interviews.

During the next two decades, Bradley also made occasional appearances in movies and on television.

Bradley visited Italy in 1987 to celebrate the 25th anniversary of Folkstudio, and he soon decided to take up permanent residence there.  Since returning to Italy, Bradley has made a few more film appearances – mostly in Italian films and a small role in the movie Daylight, starring Sylvester Stallone.  He has also appeared on six albums of spiritual- and folk-inspired music.

Personal life

Harold Bradley Jr. resided in Rome, Italy.  He and his wife Hannelore have two daughters, Michaela and Lea, and a son, Oliver.

Notes

Special Collaboration
Lionel Hampton,
Pete Seeger,
Totò Torquati,
Luca Casagrande,
Annette Meriweather,
Jho Jenkins,
Tony Scott,
Juliette Gréco,
Gianni Morandi,
Nanni Loy,
Gordon Scott,
Pina Cei,
Mark Forest,
Thomas Fritsch,
John Kitzmiller,
Alfredo Kraus,
Eduardo Sola-Franco,
Géza von Radványi,
Anthony Quinn,
Jack Palance,
Elizabeth Taylor

Recognition and Prizes
Engelwood High School – Most Valuable Player and Team Captain, varsity football
University of Iowa – Most Valuable Player, varsity football (1950), Distinguished Alumni Award (2021)
Pro Football Hall of Fame recognition as first African-American father-son combination in the NFL, alongside father, Harold W. Bradley, Sr. (1978)
Ingersoll Art Award (1940)
Medaglia in Bronzo con Incisa la Lupa Capitolina, dal Comune di Roma – in riconoscimento per la fondazione del Folkstudio e del contributo allo sviluppo ed internazionalizzazione della vita culturale e musicale italiana (luglio 2012) 
Lapide commemorativa posta sulla facciata del edificio Via Garibaldi 58, Roma, luogo natale del Folkstudio, dal Comune di Roma (luglio 2012)

Working History
McGraw Hill.
Illinois Arts Council. Curator. 1968
University of Illinois at Urbana Champaign / CUES
  Illinois Sesquicentennial Commission. 1968
Illinois State Board of Education. Superintendent for Public Instruction, Educational and Instructional Television Department. Producer

Performing Artist

Cinema
La tragica notte di Assisi, (1960)
Barabbas, (1961)
Io, Semiramide, servo di Semiramide (1962)
Maciste il gladiatore più forte del mondo, (1962)
Il gladiatore di Roma, (1962)
Cleopatra, (1963)
Maciste l'eroe più grande del mondo, (1963)
L'eroe di Babilonia, (1963)
Jason and the Argonauts, (1963)
Tarzak contro gli uomini leopardo, (1964)
Maciste nell'inferno di Gengis Khan, (1964)
La caduta dell'impero romano, (1964)
La capanna dello zio Tom, Harris (1965)
Sette contro tutti, uno dei sette gladiatori (1965)
Missione apocalisse, King Joe (1966)
Per amore... per magia..., Genio Hassan (1967)
Troppo per vivere... poco per morire, (1967)
I giorni della violenza, Nathan (1967)
Sing Sing chiama Wall Street, (1987)
Pacco, doppio pacco e contropaccotto, (1993)
Daylight – Trappola nel tunnel, Police Chief (1996)
Memsaab, (1996)
Solo x te, Angelo del Supermercato (film TV) (1998)
Gangs of New York, menestrello (2002)
In ascolto, esaminatore del poligrafo (2006)
The Same Love – l'Amore è Uguale Per Tutti, (2010)
Habemus Papam, Cardinale (2011)
Miss Wolf and the Lamb, (cortometraggio) (2011)
 YouTube Playlist: Harold Bradley – Cinema. Compiled by Oliver Bradley

Television Series
La donna di fiori, barman parts 1, 4, 5, 6, (1965)
La fiera della vanità, Sambo nella part #1.1, (1967)
The Chisholms, servant parts 1, 2, 3, 4, (1979)
Valeria medico legale, with C.Koll 2nd season, 1st part Bentornata Valeria, (2002)
Questa Sera parla Mark Twain with P. Stoppa
Il grande coltello with M. Girotti

Theater
Tango (1966–67)
L’avvenimento (1966–67)
Shakespeare in Harlem, by Langston Hughes
Mister Jazz, by L. Hughes
The Dutchman, by LeRoi Jones. Directed by S. Zacharias
La Putain Respectuese, by Jean-Paul Sartre
Arriva l'uomo del Ghiaccio. Directed by L. Squarzina
Il Volpone, by Ben Jonson
Purlie. Musical. Directed by G. Romans
A Spasso con Daisy (Driving with Miss Daisy). Co-protagonist with Pina Cei 
Se non ci fosse la Luna. Musical
La città di Dio. Directed by M.Prosperi

Discography
 Mbatha-Opasha's Voices of Glory. (1993). Come On And Praise. Featuring Mbatha-Opasha, Harold Bradley, Annette Meriwether and Jho Jhenkins. (Editore S.P.A.V.)
 Mbatha-Opasha's Voices of Glory. (1996). Thank you Lord. Featuring Mbatha-Opasha, Harold Bradley, Annette Meriwether and Jho Jhenkins. (Paoline Edizioni). EAN 8019118020246
  St. John Singers Spirituals-Gospels Chorus. (1998). Black and White Together. Featuring Harold Bradley and Joy Garrison. (ISMA Music Group – Edizioni Musicali).
 Associazione Eleniana & InterSOS. (2004). Harold Bradley & Sat&B Gospel Choir. Khumba ya my Lord – Together for Darfur / Insieme per Darfur. Vietato Chiudere Gli Occhi / Don't Close Your Eyes. (Edizione Eleniana).
 Jona's Blues Band. (2010) Back to Life Sifare. Special Guest: Harold Bradley (Edizioni Musicali / Believe Digital).
 Harold Bradley. (2012). Live al Cafè Latino. (Casa discografica TERRE SOMMERSE).
 YouTube Playlist: Harold Bradley – Music. Compiled by Oliver Bradley

Television Host
  Close-Up – WCIA – Channel 3 (CBS) 1969–1975
  Soul Side WCIA – Channel 3  (CBS) 1970–1975
People Beat – WICD – Channel 15 (NBC) 1975–1980

Special TV Appearance
 Folkstudio: Harold Bradley. Claudio Villa Notti Romane RAI TV 1965

Publicity
 Carrera occhiali (2011)

References

Bibliography 
 Jet (magazine). XXII, No. 12 (July 12, 1962), Ex-Pro Gridder-Artist Harold Bradley Tries Flicks. "Barabbas" p. 61
 Time magazine – Folk Singers: For the Love of It – Harold Bradley. Friday, April 10, 1964
 Ebony Magazine. Vol. XX, No. 11 (September 1965). Young Man With Worlds to Conquer: Harold Bradley. p. 119-125
 Jet (magazine). XXXII, No. 13 (July 6, 1967), Harold Bradley: Cleveland Browns. LeRoi Jones "Dutchman". p. 28
  Ebony Magazine. Vol. XXIV, No. 12 (October 1969). Football Heroes Invade Hollywood. p. 195-202.
 Jet (magazine). Vol. 54, No. 12 (June 8, 1978), Black Alumni Honor University of Iowa Pioneers. Harold Bradley artwork. p. 17
Volpi, Gianna. (1982). Spoleto Story. p. 126. (Edizione Rusconi).
Bianchi, Carlo Vittorio (1984). Umbria Per Vivere. "Harold". p. 247-255. (Edizione Grafica Salvi, Perugia).
Saint John's Spirituals Gospel Choir. (2001). I Nostri Dieci Anni di Musica. (Edizione Cantiere dell'Arte). SBN RMS0181768.
Lancia, Enrico. Melelli, Fabio. (2006) Dizionario del Cinema Italiano. Vol. 4: Attori Stranieri del Nostro Cinema. "Bradley Harold". p. 37-38. (Gremese Editore). .
 Piascik, Andy. (2006). The Best Show in Football: The 1946–1955 Cleveland Browns Pro Football's Greatest Dynasty. Harold Bradley. p. 265, 294, 305, 310, 382, 369. (Taylor Trade Publishers). 
Bari, Sandro. (2007). Strenna dei Romanisti: Natale di Roma LXVIII: La Musica Popolare di Roma. "Nascita del Folkstudio". p. 19-30. (Edizione Roma Amor 1980).
Polk, Rev Robert L.. Greene, Cheryll Y. (2008). Tight Little Island: Chicago's West Woodlawn Neighborhood, 1900–1950, in the Words of Its Inhabitants. (Bronx, New York : CNG Editions). .
 Piascik, Andy. (2009). Gridiron Gauntlet: The Story of the Men Who Integrated Pro Football, In Their Own Words. "Harold Bradley". p. 6-7, 169-186 (Taylor Trade Publishers)..
 Carrera, Alessandro. Sheehy, Colleen Josephine. Swiss, Thomas. (2009). Highway 61 Revisited: Bob Dylan's Road from Minnesota to the World. "On The Streets of Rome". p. 88-89. (Univ of Minnesota Press). 
 George, Nelson. (February 2010). The Black Atlas. Harold Bradley On Rome. Video interview.
 Leatherheads of the Gridiron. African-Americans in Pro Football, 1897–1946. Harold Bradley Sr and son, Harold Bradley Jr.
 Rozendaal, Neal. (2012) Duke Slater: Pioneering Black NFL Player and Judge. Harold Bradley Sr, p 115-116 and 146, Harold Bradley Jr, p. 115 and 161. .
, Mad Ducks & Bears - Football Revisited, by George Plimpton: reference to Harold Bradley's size, e-book, end of chapter 17.
Gussmag, Sina. (2012). Freie Üniversität Berlin, Praktikumsprojekt. Kurzbiografie über Harold Bradley. (Berlin).
Bradley, Oliver Quinn. (2013). Research Project Harold Bradley. (Berlin).

External links 

 Yahoo Italian Cinema Listing: Harold Bradley
 The Wild Eye – Italian Cinema Exposed
 Torre Alfina Festival
 Rozendaal, Neal. African Americans in Hawkey (University of Iowa) Sports: Harold Bradley Sr., Harold Bradley Jr.
 University of Iowa newspaper (February 24, 1960) The Daily Iowan. Reference to Harold Bradley. p. 2, bottom right "Good Listening – Today on WSUI"
 Fan Base. Harold Bradley football statistics
 Database Football. Harold Bradley Sr. Football roster
 Database Football. Harold Bradley Jr: Football roster
 University of Iowa. Harold Bradley
 University of Iowa. Harold Bradley: Football statistics, University of Iowa
 University of Iowa. Harold Bradley: Most valuable player roster
 Pro Football Hall of Fame. Harold Bradley Sr reference
 The News Observer. Reference to Harold Bradley
 Casting Agency, Rome. Reference: Harold Bradley
 Reference Harold Bradley Sr, father of Harold Bradley, Professional Football Hall of Fame
 NFL players who served during the Korean War. Harold Bradley
 NFL. Harold Bradley statistics
 St John's Singers, Manziana (Rome). Harold Bradley

 Harold Bradley Facebook page
 Harold Bradley MySpace
 SIFARE EDIZIONI MUSICALI
 Jonas Blues Band
 Virtual Folkstudio
 Peplum Blogspot: Harold Bradley – then and now
 The Annals of Iowa Volume 72 Number 2 Spring 2013, A QUARTERLY JOURNAL OF HISTORY , notes, bottom p. 141
 Bradley - An Artist on Defense, by Dick Jackman, The Daily Iowan, November 8, 1950, full-article, page 6 - http://dailyiowan.lib.uiowa.edu/DI/1950/di1950-11-08.pdf
 University of Iowa to honor ex-football player Harold Bradley Jr., a giant of creativity, By Jon Darsee, The Des Moines Register, October 7, 2021

1929 births
2021 deaths
Cleveland Browns players
Philadelphia Eagles players
Iowa Hawkeyes football players
Players of American football from Chicago
African-American players of American football
Male actors from Chicago
Military personnel from Illinois
American expatriates in Italy
Englewood Technical Prep Academy alumni
20th-century African-American sportspeople
21st-century African-American people